The arcuate vein is a vessel of the renal circulation. It is located at the border of the renal cortex and renal medulla.

References

External links
  - "Urinary System: neonatal kidney, vasculature"
  - "Urinary System: kidney, PAS stain, arcuate artery and vein, longitudinal"
  - "Urinary System: kidney, PAS stain, arcuate artery and vein, transverse"
 
  - "Renal Vasculature: Major Arteries"
  - "Renal Vasculature: Efferent Arterioles & Peritubular Capillaries"
 Training at wisc-online.com

Kidney anatomy